Tsesungún is a dialect of Huilliche, an Araucanian language spoken in Chile. Most of its speakers speak Spanish as their first language. It is closely related but barely intelligible to Mapudungun speakers.

It is classified as Araucanian/Huilliche/Tsesungun. It is used mostly in mountain valleys for ceremonial purposes.

External links
 Ethnologue.com entry for Huilliche

Languages of Chile
Mapuche language

es:Chesungun